Riniasa Castle, originally known as Thomokastron, is a medieval Byzantine fortress on the coast of Epirus, close to the modern village of Riza near Preveza. The castle is today in a ruinous condition.

History
The castle was built (or rebuilt) by Thomas I  the Despot of Epirus, at the beginning of the 14th century, hence was named Thomokastron ("Thomas' castle") or the "castle of the despotes." It was conquered by the Ottoman Empire in 1463 and liberated from the Turks along with the rest of Greek Epirus during the 20th century.

References

Sources

External links 
 Riniasa Castle at kastra.eu 

Buildings and structures in Preveza (regional unit)
Byzantine castles in Epirus (region)
Byzantine fortifications in Greece
Populated places of the Byzantine Empire